File 113 is a 1933 American pre-Code mystery film directed by Chester Franklin and starring Lew Cody, Mary Nolan and June Clyde. Monsieur Lecoq, a Parisian detective solves a series of crimes. It is based on a story by the nineteenth century French writer Émile Gaboriau.

Cast
 Lew Cody as M. Gaston Le Coq  
 Mary Nolan as Mlle. Adoree  
 Clara Kimball Young as Mme. Fauvel  
 George E. Stone as Verduet  
 William Collier Jr. as Prosper Botomy  
 June Clyde as Madeline  
 Herbert Bunston as Fauvel  
 Roy D'Arcy as De Clameran  
 Irving Bacon as Lagors  
 Harry Cording as Michele  
 Crauford Kent as Ottoman

References

Bibliography
 Pitts, Michael R. Poverty Row Studios, 1929–1940: An Illustrated History of 55 Independent Film Companies, with a Filmography for Each. McFarland & Company, 2005.

External links
 

1933 films
1933 mystery films
American mystery films
Films directed by Chester Franklin
Films set in Paris
American black-and-white films
1930s English-language films
1930s American films